Daniel Holcomb (born 1979) is the founder and director of Lahash International. Holcomb grew up in East Africa and on a trip to the region in 2002 he was asked by Susan Tabia and the Amazing Grace Orphanage to help care for orphans living in northern Uganda. He went on to begin the ministry Lahash International in 2005.

Personal
He and his wife, Erin, were married in 2007. They have three children and reside in Oregon.

Other activities
Daniel Holcomb maintains a blog at DanHolcomb.com

See also
Lahash International

References

1979 births
Living people